Aeschylus (c. 525–456 BC):
The Persians (472 BC)
Seven Against Thebes (467 BC)
The Suppliants (463 BC)
The Oresteia (458 BC, a trilogy comprising Agamemnon, The Libation Bearers and The Eumenides.)
Prometheus Bound (authorship and date of performance is still in dispute)
Phrynichus (~511 BC):
The Fall of Miletus (c. 511 BC)
Phoenissae (c. 476 BC)
Danaides
Actaeon
Alcestis
Tantalus
Achaeus of Eretria (484-c. 405 BC)
Adrastus
Linus
Cycnus
Eumenides
Philoctetes
Pirithous
Theseus
Œdipus
Achaeus of Syracuse (c. 356 BC)
Agathon (c. 448–400 BC)
Aphareus (4th century BC)
Asklepios**
Akhilleus**
Tantalos**
Sophocles (c. 495-406 BC):
Theban plays, or Oedipus cycle:
Antigone (c. 442 BC)
Oedipus Rex (c. 429 BC)
Oedipus at Colonus (401 BC, posthumous)
Ajax (unknown, presumed earlier in career)
The Trachiniae (unknown)
Electra (unknown, presumed later in career)
Philoctetes (409 BC)
Euripides (c. 480–406 BC):
Alcestis (438 BC)
Medea (431 BC)
The Heracleidae (Herakles Children) (c. 429 BC)
Hippolytus (428 BC)
Electra (c. 420 BC)
Sisyphos (415 BC)
Andromache (428-24 BC)
The Suppliants (422 BC)
Hecuba (424 BC)
Herakles (421-416 BC)
The Trojan Women (Troades) (415 BC)
Ion (414-412 BC)
Iphigenia in Tauris (414-412 BC)
Helen (412 BC)
The Phoenician Women (The Phoinissae) (411-409 BC)
Iphigenia At Aulis (Iphigenia ad Aulis) (410 BC)
Orestes (408 BC)
The Cyclops (c. 408 BC)
The Bacchae (405 BC, posthumous)
Rhesus (unknown)
 Euphorion (5th century BC); possibly the author of Prometheus Bound, which is often attributed to his father Aeschylus
 Phaesus (411-321 BC)

Comedies
 Susarion of Megara (~580 BC)
 Epicharmus of Kos (~540-450 BC)
 Phormis, late 6th century
 Dinolochus, 487 BC
 Euetes 485 BC
 Euxenides 485 BC
 Mylus 485 BC
 Chionides 487 BC
 Magnes 472 BC
 Cratinus (~520-420 BC)
 Crates c. 450 BC
 Ecphantides
 Pisander
 Epilycus
 Callias Schoenion
 Hermippus 435 BC
 Myrtilus
 Lysimachus
 Hegemon of Thasos, 413 BC
 Sophron
 Phrynichus
 Lycis, before 405 BC
Lucrideus (c. 206 BC)
 Leucon
 Lysippus
 Eupolis (~446-411 BC)
 Aristophanes (c. 446-388 BC), a leading source for Greek Old Comedy
The Acharnians (425 BC)
The Knights (424 BC)
The Clouds (423 BC)
The Wasps (422 BC)
Peace (421 BC)
The Birds (414 BC)
Lysistrata (411 BC)
Thesmophoriazusae (c. 411 BC)
The Frogs (405 BC)
Assemblywomen (c. 392 BC)
Plutus (388 BC)
 Pherecrates 420 BC
 Diocles of Phlius
 Sannyrion
 Philyllius, 394 BC
 Hipparchus
 Archippus
 Polyzelus
 Philonides
 Eunicus   5th century BC
 Telecleides 5th century BC
 Euphonius 458 BC
 Phrynichus (~429 BC)
  Cantharus 422 BC
 Ameipsias (c. 420 BC)
 Strattis (~412-390 BC)
 Cephisodorus 402 BC
 Plato (comic poet) late 5th century BC
 Theopompus  c. 410 - c.380 BC
 Nicophon 5th century BC
 Nicochares (d.~345 BC)
 Eubulus early 4th century BC
 Araros, son of Aristophanes 388, 375
 Antiphanes (~408-334 BC)
 Anaxandrides  4th century BC
 Calliades 4th century BC
 Nicostratus
 Phillipus
 Philetarus c. 390-c. 320 BC
 Anaxilas 343 BC
 Ophelion
 Callicrates
 Heraclides, 348 BC
 Alexis  (~375 - 275 BC)
 Amphis mid-4th century BC
 Axionicus
 Cratinus Junior
 Eriphus
 Epicrates of Ambracia 4th century BC
 Stephanus, 332 BC
 Strato
 Aristophon
 Euphron
 Sotades of Athens
 Augeas
 Epippus
 Heniochus
 Epigenes
 Mnesimachus
 Timotheus
 Sophilus
 Antidotus
 Naucrates
 Xenarchus
 Dromo
 Crobylus
 Philippides
 Philemon of Soli or Syracuse (~362–262 BC)
 Menander (c. 342-291 BC), a leading source for Greek New Comedy
Dyskolos (317 BC)
 Apollodorus of Carystus (~300-260 BC)
 Diphilus of Sinope  (~340-290 BC)
 Dionysius
 Timocles 324 BC
 Theophilus
 Sosippus
 Anaxippus, 303 BC
 Demetrius, 299 BC
 Archedicus, 302 BC
 Sopater, 282 BC
 Damoxenus c. 370 BC - 270 BC
 Hegesippus, or Crobylus
 Theognetus
 Bathon
 Diodorus
 Machon of Corinth/Alexandria 3rd century BC
 Poseidippus of Cassandreia (~316–250 BC)
 Epinicus (~217 BC)
 Laines or Laenes 185 BC
 Philemon 183 BC
 Chairion or Chaerion 154 BC

Ancient Greek theatre
Ancient Greek dramatists and playwrights
Playwrights